The Mandarins Drum and Bugle Corps  is a World Class competitive  drum and bugle corps.  Based in Sacramento, California, the Mandarins is a member corps of Drum Corps International (DCI). Holders of eight DCI divisional championship titles, the Mandarins made its first World Class Finals appearance on August 11, 2018, with a tenth-place finish.

History
The corps was founded in 1963 as the Ye Wah Drums and Lyras Corps, an activity for youth of Chinese-American heritage. Roy Wong, Frank Lim, Thomas Fong, and Yuk Fong had originally approached the Sacramento Chinese community with the intent of starting a drum and bugle corps to perform at the many festivals and parades held each year in the Sacramento area. After struggling to get underway, the corps made its debut on the Fourth of July, 1963. A color guard was added to the corps in 1964 and became a competitive unit in 1965. 

Entering the field as a competition corps, the group changed its name to the Mandarins Drum and Bugle Corps in 1967. The corps competed only in Northern California until making its first trip to Southern California in 1970. Since that first trip, the corps has represented its community, Sacramento, and California around the country and abroad. Mandarins appeared in the Taiwan presidential inaugural ceremonies in 1972 and '78. In 1974, they went to Hawaii to march in the King Kamehameha Parade. In 1975, they made their first trip to the Pacific Northwest and Canada. They made their first appearance at the DCI World Championships at Denver in 1978.

In 1983, under the leadership of Executive Director Ray Mar, the corps began working toward becoming a highly successful competitive corps, and they have been regular competitors in DCI since 1986, winning Class A60/Division III championships in 1987, '88, '92, and '96 through '99 and the Division II title in 2001. Mandarins moved into Division I (now World Class) in 2003, and their highest finish has been 10th place, earned in 2018, repeated in 2019 and 2022 .

In 2014, the Mandarins and the Sacramento State Department of Music entered into a partnership to conduct the Mandarins Academies. These are performing arts camps held on the Sacramento State campus to help youth develop their skills in  brass, percussion, woodwinds, and color guard performance, and in drum major conducting.

Sponsorship
Since beginning in 1963, the Mandarins have been sponsored by a volunteer booster club of parents and supporters. The Mandarins of Sacramento, Inc. is a 501 (c)(3) musical organization. JW Koester is the corps director, Jim Tabuchi is the executive director, and Raymond Mar is the organization's advisor and director emeritus.

Show summary (1978–2022) 
Source:

{| class="wikitable" style="text-align: center"
! scope="col" rowspan="2" |Year
! scope="col" rowspan="2" |Theme
! scope="col" rowspan="2" |Repertoire
! scope="col" colspan="2" |
|-
! scope="col" | Score 
! scope="col" | Placement
|-
! scope="row" | 1978 
| rowspan="5" bgcolor="lightgray" |
| Repertoire unavailable || 43.250 || 12th PlaceClass A
|-
! scope="row" | 1979–83 
| Repertoires unavailable 
| colspan="2" rowspan="3" bgcolor="lightgray" | Did not attendWorld Championships
|-
! scope="row" | 1984 
| Legacy by Bob James / Light on my Life by Bill Sharpe & Roger Odell / Loisita by Bill Sharpe & Roger Odell  
|-
! scope="row" | 1985 
| Ponteio by Edú Lobo & Jose Carlos Capinam / Rainmaker by Earl Klugh / Dark Orchid by Sammy Nestico  
|-
! scope="row" | 1986 
| Dark Orchid by Sammy Nestico / Rainmaker by Earl Klugh / Bossa Netti by Vic Cionetti / Copacabana by Barry Manilow, Jack Feldman & Bruce Sussman || 64.800 || 10th PlaceClass A60
|-bgcolor=#fcc200
! scope="row" rowspan="2" | 1987 
| rowspan="2" | 
| rowspan="2" | Storm at Sun-Up by Gino Vannelli / Celebration Suite by Armando Anthony "Chick" Corea / Voyager by Derrick Graves, Dexter Wansel, George Howard, Herb Smith & Steve Gold / Sweet Cheryl Lynn by Chuck Mangione || 85.300 || 1st PlaceClass A60Champion
|-
| 61.900
| 20th PlaceOpen Class
|- bgcolor="#fcc200"
! scope="row" rowspan="2" | 1988 
| rowspan="2" | 
| rowspan="2" | The Sorcerer and the Latin by Vic Schoen / In Her Family by Pat Metheny / Celebration Suite by Chick Corea / Voyager by Derrick Graves, Dexter Wansel, George Howard, Herb Smith & Steve Gold / More Than the Stars by Eddie Cole || 80.200 || 1st PlaceClass A60Champion
|-
| 53.700
| 19th PlaceOpen Class
|- bgcolor="#afeeee"
! scope="row" rowspan="2" | 1989 
| rowspan="2" | 
| rowspan="2" | Dreams of the Sirens by Russ Freeman / In Her Family by Pat Metheny / Minuano & The First Circle by Pat Metheny & Lyle Mays  || 87.100 || 3rd PlaceClass A60Finalist
|-
| 64.700
| 18th PlaceOpen Class
|- bgcolor="#afeeee"
! scope="row" rowspan="2" | 1990 
| rowspan="2" | 
| rowspan="2" | The First Circle by Pat Metheny & Lyle Mays / Letter From Home & Third Wind by Pat Metheny / Minuano & Flight of the Falcon by Pat Metheny & Lyle Mays || 88.200 || 2nd PlaceClass A60Finalist
|-
| 63.900
| 19th PlaceOpen Class
|-bgcolor=#afeeee
! scope="row" | 1991 
| || Let There Be Praise & In His Presence by Dick and Melodie Tunney / So Much 2 Say by Cedrick Dent & Mervyn Warren / Miracles Can Happen by Brent Henderson & Craig Patty / Make His Praise Glorious by Bill and Robin Wolaver || 85.600 || 2nd PlaceClass A60Finalist
|-bgcolor="#afeeee"
! rowspan="2" | 1992
| rowspan="2" |
| rowspan="2" | Joy (Traditional) / Jubilee Variations, Appalachian Spring & The Red Pony by Aaron Copland
| 90.000
| 4th PlaceFinalist
|-
| 67.800
| 26th PlaceDivision I
|- bgcolor="#AFEEEE"
! scope="row" rowspan="2" | 1993 
| rowspan="2" | 
| rowspan="2" | Episode Five for Brass by Carl Hilding "Doc" Severinsen / Adagio for Strings by Samuel Barber / Rocky Point Holiday by Ron Nelson || 92.600 || 2nd PlaceDivision II & IIIFinalist
|-
| 67.200
| 26th PlaceDivision I
|-bgcolor=#afeeee
! scope="row" | 1994 
|Voices of a Planet || Black Forest by Brian Slawson / Dance of the Hunter's Fire by Airto Moreira, Babatunde Olatunji, Flora Purim, Sikiru Adepoju & Vikku Vinayakram / Minuano by Pat Metheny & Lyle Mays / Bones by Mickey Hart, Zakir Hussain, Babatunde Olatunji & Flora Purim / Udu Chant by Sikiru Adepoju, Mickey Hart, Zakir Hussain & Airto Moreira / Appalachian Morning by Paul Halley || 90.800 || 3rd PlaceDivision II & IIIFinalist
|-bgcolor=#afeeee
! scope="row" rowspan="2" | 1995 
| rowspan="2" |Cinematic Impressions 
| rowspan="2" | Theme Song (from Speed) by Howard Shore / The Wedding Night by Bernard Herrmann / A Perilous Direction, The Honeymoon & The Creation (from Frankenstein) by Patrick Doyle || 91.500 || 2nd PlaceDivision IIIFinalist
|-
| 69.100
| 22nd PlaceDivision I
|- bgcolor="#fcc200"
! scope="row" rowspan="2" | 1996 
| rowspan="2" |To the Edge
| rowspan="2" | Taiko Drumming (Original) / Rhythm of the Saints by Paul Simon / Cirque du Soleil by René Dupéré || 94.000 || 1st PlaceDivision IIIChampion
|-
| 69.300
| 21st PlaceDivision I
|- bgcolor="#fcc200"
! scope="row" rowspan="2" | 1997 
| rowspan="2" |Passport
| rowspan="2" | Ghost Train (from The Ghost Train Triptych) / The Ride (from The Ghost Train) / At the Station  & The Motive Revolution (from The Ghost Train Triptych) / Bullet (from The Ghost Train)All by Eric Whitacre || 94.800 || 1st PlaceDivision IIIChampion
|-
| 73.100
| 20th PlaceDivision I
|- bgcolor="#fcc200"
! scope="row" rowspan="2" | 1998 
| rowspan="2" |Dragon Dance - Tan Dun
| rowspan="2" | Dragon Dance by Tan Dun / Happy Valley by Vanessa-Mae / The Butterfly Lovers by Chen Gang and He Zhanhao || 93.800 || 1st PlaceDivision IIIChampion
|-
| 71.500
| 23rd PlaceDivision I
|- bgcolor="#fcc200"
! scope="row" rowspan="2" | 1999 
| rowspan="2" |Transformations 
| rowspan="2" | Overture & Make Our Garden Grow (from Candide) / Symphonic Suite (from On the Waterfront)All by Leonard Bernstein || 93.700 ||1st PlaceDivision IIIChampion
|-
| 73.900
| 20th PlaceDivision I
|- bgcolor="#AFEEEE"
! scope="row" rowspan="2" | 2000 
| rowspan="2" |Katachi: The Essence of Design
| rowspan="2" | Heroes Symphony & V2 Schneider by Philip Glass / Anakin's Theme, The Droid Battle, Panaka & Duel of the Fates (from Star Wars: Episode I - The Phantom Menace) by John Williams || 94.300 || 2nd PlaceDivision II & IIIFinalist
|-
| 74.350
| 18th PlaceDivision I
|- bgcolor="#fcc200"
! scope="row" rowspan="2" | 2001 
| rowspan="2" |Festival of Music 
| rowspan="2" | Music for a Festival, Variations on an Enigma, Mountain Song & PartitaAll by Philip Sparke || 97.800 ||1st PlaceDivision II & IIIChampion
|-
| bgcolor="#D0F0C0" | 79.300
| bgcolor="#D0F0C0" | 16th PlaceDivision ISemifinalist
|- bgcolor="#AFEEEE"
! scope="row" rowspan="2" | 2002 
| rowspan="2" |Year of the Dragon 
| rowspan="2" | Year of the Dragon by Philip Sparke / Montage by Peter Graham / A London Overture & Diversions by Philip Sparke || 95.800 ||3rd PlaceDivision II & IIIFinalist
|-
| 78.050
| 19th PlaceDivision I
|-
! scope="row" | 2003 
|Black Market Bazaar || Symphony No. 2 in B Minor, Polovetsian Dances (from Prince Igor) & In the Steppes of Central Asia by Alexander Borodin / Bacchanale (from Samson and Delilah) by Camille Saint-Saëns || 80.300 || 18th PlaceDivision I
|-
! scope="row" | 2004 
|Samurai || Red Warrior (from The Last Samurai) by Hans Zimmer / Ouverture Solennelle by Pyotr Ilyich Tchaikovsky / Tabidachi, Nishi he (Departure to the West) by Joe Hisaishi / Bullet by Wong / The Way of the Sword (from The Last Samurai) by Hans Zimmer || 77.750 || 20th PlaceDivision I
|-bgcolor =#D0F0C0
! scope="row" | 2005 
|Loves Me... Loves Me Not... || Adagio (from Spartacus) by Aram Khachaturian / Rhapsody on a Theme of Paganini (Variation 18) by Sergei Rachmaninoff / Vibraphonissimo & Nuevo Tango by Astor Piazzolla / Symphonic Dances, Mvt. III by Sergei Rachmaninoff || 78.100 || 17th PlaceDivision ISemifinalist
|-bgcolor =#D0F0C0
! scope="row" | 2006 
|Rhythm Nation || Martillo by Luis Garay Percussion World / Egyptian Danza by Al Di Meola / Back Home by Nando Lauria / Din Daa Daa by George Kranz / Rhythm Nation by James Harris, Terry Lewis & Janet Jackson / Clapping Music by Steve Reich / Episode - Prelude  by Nando Lauria / Tell it All & The Way Up by Lyle Mays & Pat Metheny || 77.875 || 17th PlaceDivision ISemifinalist
|-
! scope="row" | 2007 
|Dragon Dance || Tea in Chinese Camp, Call of the Mountain (from Gates of Gold) & Shadow and Light by Joseph Curiale / Battle in the Forest (from House of Flying Daggers) by Shigeru Umebayashi / Jubiliation Dragon Dance by Tan Dun || 75.200 || 21st PlaceDivision I
|-
! scope="row" | 2008 
|River || Wind River by Joseph Curiale / Cajun Folksong by Frank Ticheli / Sunrise (from Grand Canyon Suite) by Ferde Grofé / Inferno (from The Divine Comedy) by Robert W. Smith || 77.925 || 19th PlaceWorld Class
|-
! scope="row" | 2009 
|ABSOLUTE || Absolute Fanfare: Festive Overture by Dmitri ShostakovichAbsolute Passion: Libertango by Astor PiazzolaAbsolute Joy: Ode to Joy (from Ninth Symphony) by Ludwig van Beethoven / Joy (Traditional) / Christmas Anthem by Robert W. SmithAbsolute Rhythm & Absolute Velocity: Partita by Phillip Sparke
|79.650 || 18th PlaceWorld Class
|-
! scope="row" | 2010 
|To Dream of Far Away Lands || Meetings Along the Edge by Philip Glass and Ravi Shankar / The Mountain of Fruit and Flowers by David Buckley / Samudra Manthan by Shivkumar Sharma / Quiet by Sheila Chandra, Steve Coe & Martin Smith / Ever So Lonely by Steve Coe / Ambush from Ten Sides (Chinese Traditional) || 78.100 || 19th PlaceWorld Class
|-bgcolor =#D0F0C0
! scope="row" | 2011 
|The Forty Thieves: An Ancient Tale of Spices, Toxins, and Perfumes || Octabones by Adi Morag / Spices, Perfumes, and Toxins by Avner Dorman || 75.700 || 21st PlaceWorld ClassSemifinalist
|-bgcolor =#D0F0C0
! scope="row" | 2012 
|Prophecy || Prophecy by Key Poulan || 71.600 || 23rd PlaceWorld ClassSemifinalist
|-bgcolor =#D0F0C0
! scope="row" | 2013 
| DESTINATION AMERICA: Journey of the Paper Sons || The Promise of a Better Life, Journey to America, Interrogation & FreedomAll by Key Poulan
| 79.750 || 18th PlaceWorld ClassSemifinalist
|-bgcolor =#D0F0C0
! scope="row" | 2014 
| UnbreakABLE: The Human Spirit Is Limitless || UnbreakABLE: The Human Spirit is Limitless by Key Poulan, Tony Nunez & Kevin Shaw  || 78.150 || 21st PlaceWorld ClassSemifinalist
|-bgcolor =#D0F0C0
! scope="row" | 2015 
| RESURRECTION || I. The AwakeningII. WarriorIII. The Dynasty of the EmperorIV. Forever in StoneAll by Key Poulan with Sean Womack & Mark Hunter || 76.425 || 20th PlaceWorld ClassSemifinalist
|-bgcolor =#D0F0C0
! scope="row" | 2016 
| Forbidden Forest || I. Into the ForestII. The Calling (Inspired by Devilish Love from Hemingway's Garden of Eden)III. Our Demons WithinIV. Triumph of our Inner SelfAll by Key Poulan, Mark Hunter & Sean Womack /The Calling by Roger Julia || 81.200 || 17th PlaceWorld ClassSemifinalist
|- bgcolor =#D0F0C0
! scope="row" | 2017 
| Inside the Ink || Flow by Key Poulan, Darren Van Derpoel & Bryan Nungaray / Drip by Key Poulan, Darren Van Derpoel & Bryan Nungaray / The Sound of Silence by Paul Simon / Crazy by Willie Nelson / Inside the Ink by Key Poulan, Darren Van Derpoel & Bryan Nungaray || 85.550 || 13th PlaceWorld ClassSemifinalist
|-bgcolor=#ADD8E6
! scope="row" | 2018 
| Life Rite After || String Quartet No. 8 in C Minor, Opus 110 (Allegro Molto) by Dmitri Shostakovich / Spiriti by Thomas Doss / True Colors by Tom Kelly & Billy Steinberg || 88.150 || 10th PlaceWorld ClassFinalist
|-bgcolor=#ADD8E6
! scope="row" | 2019 
| subTerra || Ritual and Discovery by Key Poulan & Ike Jackson / On the Shoulders of Giants by Peter Graham / Truman Sleeps by Philip Glass / Allure by Key Poulan / Run, Boy, Run by Yoann Lemoine & Ambroise Willaume / Sacrifice by Key Poulan & Ike Jackson || 89.300 || 10th PlaceWorld ClassFinalist
|-
! scope="row" | 2020 
| colspan="4" bgcolor=lightgray | Season cancelled due to the COVID-19 pandemic
|-
! scope="row" |2021 
| Beyond the Canvas ||  In The Air Tonight by Phil Collins / Stand Up by Cynthia Erivo & Joshuah Brian Campbell / Original Compositions by Key Poulan, Bryan Harmsen, Ben Pyles & Andy Filipiak
| colspan="2" bgcolor=lightgray |No scored competitions	
|-bgcolor=#ADD8E6
! scope="row" |2022
|The Otherside' || Another Brick in the Wall Pt 2 by Pink Floyd / Otherside by Avi Kaplan / The Wall, The Revolution, The Distrintergration & The Triumph by Key Poulan, Bryan Harmsen, Ben Pyles & Andy Filipiak
| 90.013
| 10th PlaceWorld ClassFinalist
|}

Traditions
The Mandarins' corps song is a chorale section of Philip Sparke's Year of the Dragon, Part 2''.

References

External links
Official website

Drum Corps International World Class corps
American instrumental musical groups
Musical groups established in 1963
1963 establishments in California